KXRC 105.3 FM is a radio station licensed to Durango, Colorado.  The station broadcasts a Classic rock format, is owned by KRJ Company, and is an affiliate of the syndicated Pink Floyd show "Floydian Slip." The station's name and logo refer to a popular eponymous rock climbing site, X-Rock, located on the north edge of town.

References

External links
KXRC's official website

Classic rock radio stations in the United States
XRC